Cəlayir is a village and municipality in the Qakh District of Azerbaijan. It has a population of 1,407.

References 

Populated places in Qakh District